The Carter-Simmons House is a historic house at 218 Coy Smith Road, near Albertson, North Carolina.  It is a -story wood-frame structure with an integral front porch, three bays wide, with several types of exterior wood coverings, a product of its unusual construction history.  The house was built in the early 19th century as a two-story wood-frame structure, and was reduced in 1853 to its present size by the removal its upper floor.  It is one of the best-preserved examples of this type of coastal cottage to be found in Duplin County.

The house was listed on the National Register of Historic Places in 2015.

See also
National Register of Historic Places listings in Duplin County, North Carolina

References

Houses on the National Register of Historic Places in North Carolina
Federal architecture in North Carolina
Houses completed in 1853
Houses in Duplin County, North Carolina
National Register of Historic Places in Duplin County, North Carolina